Melanie Pearson (also Mangel) is a fictional character from Australian soap opera Neighbours played by Lucinda Cowden. The actress was initially signed to the soap on a recurring basis for a few weeks. She made her first screen appearance during the episode broadcast on 30 July 1987. The character departed on 24 October 1991. In 2005, Cowden reprised her role for Neighbours' 20th anniversary celebrations. She reprised the role again on a recurring basis from 8 January 2021, then later as a regular from 22 September 2021. Melanie appeared until the last episode of Neighbours, which sees her get married to Toadie Rebecchi (Ryan Moloney).

Casting
Actress Lucinda Cowden joined the cast of Neighbours as Melanie for seven episodes in 1987. She returned for six episodes the following year. Cowden left to star in daytime soap opera The Power, The Passion, but when the show was cancelled Cowden decided to call the Neighbours producer about a return. Coincidentally, the actress called on the same day Annie Jones (who played Jane Harris) had decided not to renew her contract and she was invited to re-join the cast as a regular cast member.

Development

Characterisation
Melanie was introduced as the girlfriend of Henry Ramsay (Craig McLachlan). The following year, she returned as Paul Robinson's (Stefan Dennis) temporary secretary. Despite being "a nightmare to work with", Paul realised that she was good at her job and kept her on. Melanie moved in with widower Des Clarke (Paul Keane) and helped cheer him up, following the death of his wife. In her 1994 book, The Neighbours Programme Guide, Josephine Monroe stated that Melanie had a "zany personality, wacky outfits and outrageous laugh". Monroe described Melanie's distinctive laugh as sounding like "a seal having a hernia." Cowden thought that she did not have much in common with her character, except that they are both fun. That aspect of Melanie's personality initially attracted Cowden to the role. The actress also revealed that she did not laugh in the same way Melanie did.

Marriage to Joe Mangel
In 1991, Melanie married Joe Mangel (Mark Little) and the two characters exited the serial soon after. Initially Joe and Melanie seemed to have little in common and had not considered a romantic relationship with one another. However, Joe's feelings changed when Glen Donnelly (Richard Huggett) pointed out to Joe that he was wasting his time finding "a new love" when she, in the form of Melanie, was under his nose the whole time. Of Melanie's feelings towards Joe, Cowden told Mary Fletcher from Inside Soap, "Melanie took a long time to realise how she felt about Joe because she's such a dreamer. She has this fantasy about some prince in shining armour who'd come along on a white horse and sweep her off her feet. It didn't occur to her that the man who would make her happy was so close to home."

Melanie was set to marry her fiancé Simon Hunter (Frederick Whitlock) when she was cast in a television dating show along with Joe. When she and Joe won a romantic weekend away, Joe declared his feelings for her and Melanie realised her true feelings for him. Melanie also realised why she was unable to fully commit herself to Simon. Cowden thought the storyline was wonderful and like the viewers, she got caught up in it. Knowing that his children got on well with Melanie was important to Joe and his son, Toby (Ben Geurens), helped him deal with his "awkwardness" towards proposing to her. Melanie turned down the proposal as a joke, but quickly said yes. Cowden told Fletcher that in the end Melanie had fallen for Joe as he was "true, loyal and honest". 

In Australia, there was much anticipation from viewers about the wedding and whether they would actually go through with it. Cowden recalled being heckled in shops by fans who demanded to know the story's outcome. Well known for a dress sense that is out of the ordinary, Joe begins to worry about what Melanie will wear to their wedding. Cowden told Richard Shears from TV Quick that "you can understand poor Joe's concern, dippy Melanie is the sort of character who could turn up in a tutu and tap dance down the aisle." Little added that Joe is worried but "he loves her and he figures he's going to marry her, no matter what." When Melanie arrives at the church, she is wearing a traditional dress. Cowden was happy that Melanie had chosen tradition over kookiness because she had taken the wedding so seriously in the story. Both Cowden and Little were proud of the romance story they had helped to create. She added "we both love our characters, we've worked very hard to make the romance special."

Departure
Joe and Melanie were married in front of their friends and they headed off to Europe for their honeymoon, which also marked their exit from the show. When Little decided that it was time for him to move on from Neighbours, his decision coincided with Cowden's feelings of restlessness. The actress explained "I'd been in the series for two and half years and it felt to me as if I'd got the best out of Melanie." Cowden continued saying that she did not want to return without Little and have to work on a storyline that would see Melanie falling in love with a new character. It did not feel right to her and she and Little thought Joe and Melanie's honeymoon would be the perfect exit for them. Their departure also coincided with plans to rejuvenate the show after the show's ratings declined. Network Ten's executive John Holmes oversaw multiple departures in 1991, which made way for new "young and spunky" characters. Cowden reprised the role in 2005 and joined several returning cast members for the show's 20th anniversary episode, which was broadcast in July. It emerges that Melanie and Joe's marriage has ended. Cowden admitted that she was sad upon hearing the development, saying "I think Joe and Mel would have stayed together forever but as we aren't going to go back, I suppose the producers had the right to do it."

Reintroduction
On 9 December 2020, the serial's social media team confirmed that Cowden had reprised the role, after she was briefly seen in a promotional trailer for the show. Cowden's return scenes began airing from 8 January 2021. Cowden told Sarah Ellis of Inside Soap that her return came as a surprise, but it was a welcome one, as her other work had shut down due to the COVID-19 pandemic. She continued, "It was just brilliant to be working, but also so much fun to be here again. It was so nice to work with old mates, some of the crew from years are still here. It was just really joyous, and I was so delightfully welcomed by the new and the old cast." Of how Melanie had changed over the years, Cowden said she was "worse than she used to be!" She is more free-spirited than before and continues to not worry about what other people think of her. Cowden confirmed that Melanie's signature laugh would also be back, though it took her some time to remember how to do it. She likened it to starting a car engine that had not been used in a number of years.

Cowden explained that Melanie is now living in the suburb of Ansons Corner, having made a permanent return to Australia. She comes back to Erinsborough after Des Clarke contacts her on social media and invites her to lunch with him and Jane Harris. Cowden enjoyed her first scenes with Keane and Jones, as she had maintained a friendship with both of them since her time in Neighbours. Melanie voices disapproval about Jane's new relationship with Clive Gibbons (Geoff Paine) and Cowden said Melanie thinks it is "an absolute disaster!" She worries for Jane when she learns Clive is spending time with his former partner, and Cowden reckoned that Melanie might have been in a similar situation where someone she was dating was still seeing their ex. Melanie talks non-stop and appears to have worn Des and Jane down by the end of their lunch. Cowden also said Melanie would eventually would meet with Paul Robinson, but in her initial episodes, Paul hides from her when he hears her laugh.

When asked what storylines were coming up for Melanie, Cowden said that she would start working for Toadfish Rebecchi (Ryan Moloney) as his personal assistant. She thought Melanie and Toadie had a nice relationship and their story involves various misunderstandings, which provides good comedy. She added: "Melanie gets her nose into places in the legal office that she probably shouldn't. She's very professional, but she likes to help people, she sometimes goes a bit above and beyond." In May 2021, Cowden confirmed that she would continue "popping in and out of the show", but hoped for a more permanent role. On 22 September 2021, Cowden was added to the opening titles as a semi-regular character.

Relationship with Toadfish Rebecchi
Writers soon established a romantic relationship between Melanie and Toadie. The storyline was written in such a way that viewers were unaware that the characters were dating. Moloney thought it was a good way to start the plot, telling Ellis: "The writers have been very clever in the way the romance is divulged to viewers. Mackenzie Hargreaves (Georgie Stone) sets it up that Toadie is unfairly treating Melanie at work – only for it to be revealed, with no real clues, that they are in fact having a fling!" The couple previously went on a disastrous date after meeting through a dating app, and they eventually agreed to be friends. Ellis noted that something obviously must have happened between them to make them change their minds, but questioned why they kept the relationship a secret. Moloney explained that they both thought they would be judged because the romance formed in the office. He liked that the age gap between them is not raised until later. He also said that they are two consenting adults who are having fun and not hurting anyone. Moloney called Melanie "fun and spontaneous" and continued "She has no hang-ups, and she likes Toadie just for being him. They're both at a stage in their lives where they want to seize the moment and enjoy themselves. Toadie enjoys just being silly again." Toadie and Melanie are almost caught when Terese Willis (Rebekah Elmaloglou) unexpectedly enters the law office, while Melanie is on her knees, forcing her to hide under Toadie's desk. They later decide to use Mackenzie's accusations as a way to cover up their romance. Moloney told Ellis that he and Cowden were enjoying the storyline while they could, knowing that there would be "roadblocks" for their characters in the future, including commitment issues and Toadie's children.

Feud with Anna Buke
In August 2021, writers explored Melanie's absence from the serial between her stint in 2005 and her reintroduction in 2021. Susannah Alexander reported that a "shocking secret from Melanie's past" would be revealed on screen. Mackenzie helps Melanie find a new job after she and Toadie decide it would be best if they stop working with one another in order to secure their relationship. Mackenzie helps Melanie with her CV and phones one of her references, a law firm, where Melanie was romantically involved with the firm owner, Justin Buke (Mick O'Malley), who was married to Anna Buke (Fiona Macleod) at the time. Cowden explained in an interview, "Justin Buke is a big time lawyer who used to be Mel's boss. They had an affair and Justin's wife Anna found out, causing Mel to lose her job, some friends and pride. Mel decided to get back at them when they refused to pay her severance and it didn't go well." Simon Timblick of whattowatch.com called it an "ill-fated affair." When the news that Melanie wants to use the Bukes' law firm as a reference reaches Anna, she is described as "furious" and goes to Rebecchi Law to "give Melanie a piece of her mind." Toadie soon discovers that the Bukes have a restraining order in place against Melanie after she "bitterly" placed a sack of prawns in Anna's car. The "scandal" is a hiccup for Melanie and Toadie's relationship, with actor Ryan Moloney explaining, "He thought he and Mel had an honest, open relationship. Now, this brings up a lot of questions about Melanie's past that he was completely unaware of. He starts to question the sincerity of their relationship. He thought they were building something special together, but now wonders if this is just what Melanie does with all her bosses." Katie Baillie of Metro questioned, "Has her sexy past ruined their loved-up future?"

Love triangle
Writers later established a love triangle storyline between Melanie, Toadie and his former love interest Rose Walker (Lucy Durack). After Rose's marriage breaks down, she returns to Erinsborough, but is "disappointed" to learn that Toadie is now in a relationship with Melanie. When asked about Melanie, Durack told a writer for TV Week "In any other circumstance, I think Rose would like Melanie. But in this instance, she sees her as a roadblock in the way of her romantic future with Toadie." Melanie becomes overprotective when she sees Rose "constantly having cosy chats with her fella." When Melanie confronts Rose, she throws Anna Buke's restraining order back in Melanie's face. Following Anna and Rose's arrivals, Melanie is left "trying hard to hold onto her man." At the Erinsborough Shorts and Brief's film festival, Toadie and Rose play a series of pranks on one another, including Toadie spiking Rose's drink with chili, which causes Rose to spit it on Melanie's face, leaving Melanie to fall backwards on to a buffet table. Melanie is taken to hospital afterwards and Moloney said "Toadie understands how Melanie is feeling, so he tries to give her as much attention as she needs to be secure and hopefully keep the peace between the two women. He's aware Rose may have some feelings for him, but he's in a good place with Mel after a rocky patch. He really is trying his best to be a better partner." 

Rose uses the situation to get closer to Toadie by asking him to represent her in the event of a lawsuit from Melanie. In an attempt to thank him, Rose kisses Toadie, who immediately "pulls away and tells a hurt Melanie." Cowden explained, "Mel has been made out to look a bit crazier than she is, and Rose has taken advantage of that. Rose has added to the idea that Mel is too 'out there' and not good enough for Toadie. Soon, Mel starts to feel that that's what everyone thinks – including Toadie." Toadie feels "conflicted", while Moloney said in an interview, "When things go well with Mel, they're awesome. But when they're bad, they're really bad. Things just seem so light-hearted and fun with Rose. He's confused." At the film festival premiere, Lucy tries to "woo" Toadie, with Durack explaining, "Everyone is dressed in costume and Rose hears that Melanie is going to go as Elle Woods, because Legally Blonde is Toadie's favourite movie. Rose goes and buys the best Elle Woods costume, so there's nothing left for Melanie. So she does mean things like that." Simultaneously, Melanie teams up with Mackenzie and Susan Kennedy (Jackie Woodburne), and records a short film titled Ode to Toad, in which she confesses her love for Toadie at the premiere. The night ends with Toadie picking Melanie over Rose. The storyline also sparked Neighbours fans to choose their side by posting #TeamMelanie or #TeamRose on social media. At the end of her stint, Durack apologised for her character's plotting and said that she was "#TeamMelanie all the way."

Character reflection
The cancellation of Neighbours was announced in 2022 and as part of the finale, Melanie gets married to Toadie. Cowden said prior to filming the serial's final episode, "I think we've all been really aware of enjoying every moment, and really being present in everything that we're doing. With all of the moments that we'd usually take for granted in a normal day, I think people are standing back and going, 'We're going to miss this!'" Cowden explained that she heard of the cancellation via Twitter, which she called "a really crappy way to find out". Cowden explained to Daniel Kilkelly of Digital Spy that she believed if Neighbours had similar viewing rates in Australia than in the UK, then the serial would not have been cancelled. Cowden praised the serial's executive producer Jason Herbison for wanting to end the show with no loose ends and she explained that Melanie "would have definitely" had more storylines if the show continued, but thought that it was "nice that she's busy on screen right until the end." Cowden also expressed her gratitude for having a second stint on the serial, adding that she was "so glad" to have been invited back in 2021. She continued, "I would definitely have stayed for as long as they would have had me, I reckon. When you're young and you do something like this, you don't realise how important it is. I dismissed it a lot when I was younger. It was when I got older that I realised how important it had been for me and everything I'd learned. Coming back has been totally joyous and I have done it so wholeheartedly and completely. I've committed to Mel and making her what she was before, not trying to turn her into somebody else. I'm so pleased to be in this final cast. I think it's an absolute privilege and honour to be part of the final cast of such an important show for Australian television." Cowden also said that she liked Melanie being paired with Toadie. She said, "I wouldn't have ever put Mel and Toadie together on paper and I was surprised when their relationship started. I was especially surprised when it continued rather than just being an affair. But I think they wholeheartedly enjoy each other's company."

Storylines

1987–2005
Henry Ramsay brings Melanie home to meet his mother Madge (Anne Charleston), his sister Charlene (Kylie Minogue) and her husband Scott (Jason Donovan). Melanie's hiccupping animalistic laugh makes Henry's family feel uneasy and Madge and Charlene conspire to set her up with Mike Young (Guy Pearce) and Gino Rossini (Joey Perrone). Henry sees Gino handing Melanie his number and the relationship fizzles out but Melanie and Henry remain friends. Melanie is next seen working as a temporary secretary at The Daniels Corporation for Paul Robinson.

When Henry has relationship difficulties with Bronwyn Davies (Rachel Friend), Melanie is on hand to lend a sympathetic ear during a party. Bronwyn mistakes this for something more and is annoyed. Henry tries to resume dating Melanie after seeing that he is getting nowhere with Bronwyn but Melanie turns him down. The following year Melanie reappears and moves in with Mike, Des Clarke and his son Jamie at Number 28. Melanie's chirpy nature immediately wins Des over but when she interferes in his relationship with Jane Harris by taking a call and blasting Jane for her decision to end things with Des, he is angered but comes to realise a long-distance relationship with Jane would not be feasible and forgives Melanie.

After a one-night stand with Paul, who rejects and hurts her, Melanie finds happiness with nerdy waiter Kelvin Stubbs (Michael Fletcher). When Kelvin makes a pass at Melanie's friend Christina Alessi (Gayle Blakeney), Melanie refuses to believe her until she uncovers evidence of Kelvin being a love cheat and promptly dumps him. Melanie later becomes involved with much older businessman, Roger Walsh (Gregory Ross) and becomes engaged to him but the romance ends when Roger's daughter Tania (Angela Nicholls) opposes the relationship.

When her friend Kerry Bishop (Linda Hartley) is killed during a protest against duck hunting, Melanie moves in with Kerry's widower Joe Mangel and helps with the children Toby and Sky (Miranda Fryer). When Sky's biological father Eric Jensen (John Ley) comes to claim custody, Melanie offers to marry Joe to help him secure custody of Sky, but he politely declines. Melanie begins dating Simon Hunter and becomes engaged to him. Joe is devastated as he has developed feelings for her. When Melanie fills in for a contestant on a dating show, she is shocked to find Joe is her "dream date" and the pair win a romantic weekend together. Joe confesses his feelings, as does Melanie. When they return Melanie ends her engagement with Simon.

Joe and Melanie become engaged and marry in front of their friends, family and neighbours. Within weeks of their wedding, Joe receives a call from England that his mother Nell (Vivean Gray) has suffered a heart attack and to fund the medical expenses they will need to sell Number 32. Melanie and Joe decide to leave, taking Sky with them and leaving Toby in the care of school principal Dorothy Burke (Maggie Dence), in order for him to continue with his schooling. After several months touring Europe, they return and set up home in the country. Toby visits them at Christmas. The following year the family is reunited when Toby re-joins them after a new school is opened in the district. When Sky returns to Erinsborough, she tells her grandfather Harold Bishop (Ian Smith) that Joe and Melanie divorced a decade earlier. Two years later, Melanie appears in Annalise Hartman's (Kimberly Davies) documentary about Ramsay Street, where she is seen living in London and talking about past mistakes including working for Paul and marrying Joe.

2021–2022
Melanie later returns to Australia and moves to Ansons Corner. She returns to Erinsborough after being contacted by Des, and meets up with him and Jane for coffee. They explain that they are not together, and that Jane is now in a relationship with Clive Gibbons. Melanie does not think they are well suited, especially as Clive is busy supporting his former partner, Sheila Canning (Colette Mann). Melanie goes on a date with Toadfish Rebecchi, after they match on Tinder. Toadie does not recognise Melanie at first, but she admits to using an old photo and lying about her age. Toadie finds it difficult to get a word in due to Melanie's overly talkative personality. Toadie later hires Melanie as his personal assistant, and a Valentine's Day misunderstanding leads the pair to fear that each other want to be more than friends. After several months working together, Toadie and Melanie begin a casual relationship, but hide it from their friends and family. The truth comes out when Toadie's assistant Mackenzie Hargreaves mistakenly believes Toadie is dating Susan Kennedy's arch-nemesis Angela Lane (Amanda Harrison). Melanie believes that Angela has purposefully sabotaged one of Toadie's client cases so takes revenge by dumping manure outside her house. In the resulting clash with Melanie, Angela nearly strikes Toadie's infant son Hugo Somers (John Turner) with her car. Melanie blames herself and tells Toadie they cannot be together as she is too immature. Toadie helps Melanie see that she is good with Hugo and his daughter Nell Rebecchi (Scarlett Anderson), but he is annoyed when Melanie reveals to his children that they are dating before he is ready to tell them. They overcome their problems to become a real couple, but Toadie later begins avoiding Melanie. She forces him to admit that their increasingly serious relationship has brought up his grief for his dead wife Sonya Rebecchi (Eve Morey), but Melanie helps Toadie see that she is not replacing Sonya and that together they can honour her memory. They later get engaged and decide to move away from Ramsay. They are married at Lassiters Lake and receive messages from their family and friends, but eventually decide to keep living in Erinsborough. Their wedding reception is held on Ramsay Street.

Reception
A writer for the BBC's Neighbours website said Melanie's most notable moment was "Asking Joe to marry her". Ian Morrison, author of Neighbours: The Official Annual 1992, stated "If Melanie offers to lend a hand beware...her efforts don't always turn out as she would like!" Katy Moon from Inside Soap praised Joe and Melanie's wedding, saying "No one can get hitched in soap these days without some kind of ruckus. But Joe Mangel and Melanie Pearson's wedding was a breeze and harks back to a time of innocence in soapland." Moon commented that Joe had found his match "in bubbly Mel". Of Mel's style choices at the wedding, TV Quick's Richard Shears stated "she is renowned for her weird clothes and viewers were eager to know what she'd come up with for the big day." A Coventry Telegraph reporter observed that Melanie became "a soap favourite" and branded her a "girl next door with a foghorn laugh, the dizzy secretary with a heart of gold who had thousands of viewers tuning in to watch her antics."

The Herald'''s Neil Cooper was a fan of both the actress and the character, quipping "Cowden was the only real point to Neighbours for three years in the late eighties, the only real spark of ironic life beyond the ready-made airbrushed froth. Or rather Melanie, the character Cowden didn't so much play as wore like a Day-Glo romper suit crash coursing her way through the 'hood, was. Melanie was a hilarious cartoon creation, a ditzy, daffy, polka-dotted, colour-clashing surrealist heart-throb who occupied a planet made in her own garish image, before hitching up with boy-next-door Joe Mangle and leaving the street an all together greyer place." Peter Holmes of The Sydney Morning Herald disliked the character, calling her a "brain-dead freak". Writing for BBC News, Genevieve Hassan included Melanie's laugh in her feature on the show's memorable moments. Hassan quipped, "Madcap Melanie (played by Lucinda Cowden) was best known on the soap for her foghorn, seal-like laugh and her frequent trips to the local Erinsborough astrologer, Madame Zolga." Sarah Ellis of Inside Soap was a fan of Toadie and Melanie's romance, writing "It may be an unconventional pairing, although we think Toadie and Melanie could work – after all, they both like to embrace the quirky side of life." Amy West described Melanie as "lovesick." Adam Beresford from HuffPost'' stated that Melanie's "seal-like laugh still haunts us".

References

External links
Melanie Pearson at BBC Online

Neighbours characters
Television characters introduced in 1987
Female characters in television
Fictional secretaries